Ad Dinder is a district of Sennar state, Sudan.

References

Districts of Sudan